WFGM-FM  (93.1 FM) is a radio station licensed to Barrackville, West Virginia, serving North Central West Virginia.  WFGM-FM is owned by West Virginia Radio Corporation and operated under their AJG Corporation licensee.

On December 5, 2019, WFGM-FM changed their format from country to contemporary Christian, branded as "The New Journey FGM".

References

External links

1993 establishments in West Virginia
Radio stations established in 1993
Contemporary Christian radio stations in the United States
FGM-FM